Ineke is Dutch feminine given name. It originated as a diminutive of Ina, which can be a short form of a number names, like Catharina, Gesina, Hendrina, Klazina, etc. It is also a rare possibly matronymic surname in the Netherlands.  Ineke may refer to

First name
Ineke Bakker (born 1956), Dutch sprint canoeist
Ineke Dezentjé Hamming-Bluemink (born 1954), Dutch politician
Ineke Donkervoort (born 1953), Dutch rower
Ineke van Gent (born 1957), Dutch politician
Ineke Hans (born 1966), Dutch industrial designer
Ineke Lambers-Hacquebard (born 1946), Dutch politician
Ineke Mulder (born 1950), Dutch politician
Ineke Ran (born 1962), Dutch swimmer
Ineke Sluiter (born 1959), Dutch classicist
Ineke Tigelaar (born 1945), Dutch swimmer
Ineke Van Schoor (born 1995), Belgian acrobatic gymnast
Ineke van Wetering (1934–2011), Dutch anthropologist and Surinamist

Surname
Eric Ineke (born 1947), Dutch jazz drummer

References

Dutch feminine given names